Lucky Larrigan is a 1932 American Western film directed by John P. McCarthy and written by McCarthy and Wellyn Totman. The film stars Rex Bell, Helen Foster, Stanley Blystone, Julian Rivero, John Elliott and Gordon De Main. The film was released on December 1, 1932, by Monogram Pictures.

Cast           
Rex Bell as Craig Larrigan  
Helen Foster as Virginia Bailey
Stanley Blystone as Kirk Warren
Julian Rivero as Pedro 
John Elliott as J. C. Bailey
Gordon De Main as Sheriff Jim 
Wilfred Lucas as John Larrigan
George Chesebro as Mike

References

External links
 

1932 films
American Western (genre) films
1932 Western (genre) films
Monogram Pictures films
Films directed by John P. McCarthy
1930s English-language films
1930s American films